Rediker is a surname. Notable people with the surname include:

 Douglas Rediker, American investment banker
 Heidi Crebo-Rediker, American economist
 Marcus Rediker, (born 1951), American professor, historian, writer, and activist